Marco Polo Reyes is a Mexican mixed martial artist who competed in the UFC. A professional since 2009, he was also a contestant on The Ultimate Fighter: Latin America 2.

Background
Reyes was born on November 7, 1984 in Mexicali, Baja California, Mexico. Prior to become a fighter, Reyes was a carpenter. He started self-defense classes which led him into MMA training and later in competition. He was the Mexico national champion and held two regional titles in Mexico.

Mixed martial arts career

Early career 

Reyes was attached to various promotions in Mexico from 2009 to 2014 with a MMA record of 4–3–0 period before joining The Ultimate Fighter: Latin America 2 competition.

The Ultimate Fighter: Latin America 

In 2015, Reyes joined The Ultimate Fighter: Latin America 2 under team Efrain Escudero. On episode 7, Reyes faced Christihian Soto from Nicaragua in a lightweight fight, winning via TKO due to punches in the second round. On episode 10, Reyes faced Horacio Gutiérrez from Mexico in the semi-final round. He was defeated via TKO due to punches in the first round.

Ultimate Fighting Championship 

Reyes faced Cesar Arzamendia on the preliminary card on UFC Fight Night 78 on November 21, 2015. He starched Arzmaendia with a win via one punch knock-out in the first round.

On June 4, 2016, Reyes was up against Dong Hyun Ma on June 4, 2016 at UFC 199. Reyes knocked out Kim in the third round. Both participants were awarded Fight of the Night honors.

Reyes faced Jason Novelli on November 5, 2016 at UFC Fight Night 98 and nabbed split decision win with the scores card of 29–28, 28–29 and 29–28.

Reyes next faced James Vick on May 13, 2017 at UFC 211. He lost the fight via TKO in the first round.

Reyes faced Matt Frevola on January 14, 2018 at UFC Fight Night: Stephens vs. Choi. He won by knockout one minute into the fight. He was awarded Performance of the Night.

Reyes received a  suspension  from USADA for six months for tested positive for banned substance ostarine from an out-of-competition drug test conducted on March 8, 2018 resulted from contaminated supplement.

Reyes faced Damir Hadžović on February 23, 2019 at UFC Fight Night 145. He lost the fight via knockout in the second round.

Reyes faced Drew Dober on June 29, 2019 at UFC on ESPN 3. He lost the fight via technical knockout in the first round.

Reyes faced Kyle Nelson on September 21, 2019 at UFC on ESPN+ 17. He lost the fight via TKO in the first round.

Reyes was released by the UFC on February 11, 2020.

Post-UFC career
As the first fight after the release, Reyes faced Ricardo Arreola at Lux 011 on November 20, 2020. He won the fight via first-round knockout.

He faced Marco Elpidio at Lux 013 on May 7, 2021. He won the bout via unanimous decision.

Reyes then faced Fernando Martinez at Lux 018 on November 5, 2021. He lost the fight via first-round submission.

Championships and accomplishments
Ultimate Fighting Championship
Fight of the Night (One time) vs. Dong Hyun Ma
Performance of the Night (Two times)  vs. Cesar Arzamendia and Matt Frevola 
Fifth shortest average time in lightweight division's history (6:51)
Third best strike differential in lightweight history (2.10)
Third highest rate for strikes landed per min., in UFC history (6.69)

Mixed  martial arts record

|-
|Loss
|align=center|10–8
|Fernando Martinez
|Submission (guillotine choke)
|Lux Fight League 018
|
|align=center|1
|align=center|4:03
|Acapulco, Mexico
|
|-
|Win
|align=center|10–7
|Marco Elpidio
|Decision (unanimous)
|Lux Fight League 013
|
|align=center|3
|align=center|5:00
|San Pedro Garza García, Nuevo León, Mexico
|
|-
|Win
|align=center|9–7
|Ricardo Arreola
|TKO (punches)
|Lux Fight League 011
|
|align=center|1
|align=center|4:08
|Monterrey, Mexico
|
|-
|Loss
|align=center|8–7
|Kyle Nelson
|TKO (punches)
|UFC Fight Night: Rodríguez vs. Stephens 
|
|align=center|1
|align=center|1:36
|Mexico City, Mexico
|
|-
|Loss
|align=center|8–6
|Drew Dober
|TKO (punches)
|UFC on ESPN: Ngannou vs. dos Santos 
|
|align=center|1
|align=center|1:07
|Minneapolis, Minnesota, United States
|
|-
|Loss
|align=center|8–5
|Damir Hadžović
|TKO (punches)
|UFC Fight Night: Błachowicz vs. Santos 
|
|align=center|2
|align=center|2:03
|Prague, Czech Republic
|
|-
|Win
|align=center|8–4
|Matt Frevola
|KO (punches)
|UFC Fight Night: Stephens vs. Choi
|
|align=center|1
|align=center|1:00
|St. Louis, Missouri, United States
|
|-
|Loss
| align=center| 7–4
| James Vick
| TKO (punches)
| UFC 211
| 
| align=center| 1
| align=center| 2:39
| Dallas, Texas, United States
| 
|-
| Win
| align=center| 7–3
| Jason Novelli
| Decision (split)
| The Ultimate Fighter Latin America 3 Finale: dos Anjos vs. Ferguson
| 
| align=center| 3
| align=center| 5:00
| Mexico City, Mexico
| 
|-
| Win
| align=center| 6–3
| Dong Hyun Ma
| KO (punches)
| UFC 199
| 
| align=center| 3
| align=center| 1:52
| Inglewood, California, United States
| 
|-
| Win
| align=center| 5–3
| Cesar Arzamendia
| KO (punch)
| The Ultimate Fighter Latin America 2 Finale: Magny vs. Gastelum
| 
| align=center| 1
| align=center| 3:42
| Monterrey, Mexico
| 
|-
| Win
| align=center| 4–3
| José Luis Medrano
| Submission (triangle choke)
| World Fighters Championship 13
| 
| align=center| 2
| align=center| 2:05
| Monterrey, Mexico
|
|-
| Loss
| align=center| 3–3
| Erick Montaño
| Submission (rear-naked choke)
| Xtreme Kombat 25
| 
| align=center| 1
| align=center| N/A
| Naucalpan de Juárez, Mexico
| 
|-
| Loss
| align=center| 3–2
| Randall Wallace
| TKO (punches)
| Argos MMA Fighting
| 
| align=center| 1
| align=center| 2:58
| Jalisco, Mexico
| 
|-
| Loss
| align=center| 3–1
| Ran Weathers
| Submission (rear-naked choke)
| Duelo De Giagantes: Round 2
| 
| align=center| 1
| align=center| 1:27
| Zumpango, Mexico
| 
|-
| Win
| align=center| 3–0
| Mike Prokop
| TKO (punches)
| Duelo De Giagantes: Round 1
| 
| align=center| 2
| align=center| 4:27
| Mexico City, Mexico
|
|-
| Win
| align=center| 2–0
| Jaime Tyson
| TKO (punches)
| Black Fighting Championships 6
| 
| align=center| 1
| align=center| N/A
| Jalisco, Mexico
|
|-
| Win
| align=center| 1–0
| Alejandro Aguilar
| TKO (punches)
| Inevitable Fight Night
| 
| align=center| 1
| align=center| N/A
| Jalisco, Mexico
|

See also
 List of current UFC fighters
 List of male mixed martial artists

References

External links
 
 

Mexican male mixed martial artists
Lightweight mixed martial artists
1984 births
Living people
Sportspeople from Mexicali
Ultimate Fighting Championship male fighters